The location of the geographical centre of Europe depends on the definition of the borders of Europe, mainly whether remote islands are included to define the extreme points of Europe, and on the method of calculating the final result. Thus, several places claim to host this hypothetical centre.

Current claimants 
Locations currently vying for the distinction of being the centre of Europe include:
 the village of Kremnické Bane or the neighbouring village Krahule, near Kremnica, in central Slovakia
 the small town of Rakhiv, or the village of Dilove near Rakhiv, in  western Ukraine
 the village of Girija, near Vilnius, in Lithuania
 a point on the island of Saaremaa in Estonia
 a point near Polotsk, or in Vitebsk, or near Babruysk, or near lake Sho in Belarus
 a point near the town of Tállya, in north-eastern Hungary

Extreme points of Europe

History of claims

Poland 

The first official declaration of the Centre of Europe was made in 1775 by the Polish royal astronomer and cartographer Szymon Antoni Sobiekrajski, who calculated it to be in the town of Suchowola near Białystok in modern north-eastern Poland. The method used was that of calculating equal distances from the extreme points of Europe: the westernmost point in Portugal; the easternmost point in the Central Urals; the northernmost point in Norway; and the southernmost point in Greece (islands were not taken into consideration). There is a monument commemorating that definition in Suchowola .

Austria-Hungary

Blaufusz, today in Slovakia 

In about 1815 there was a declaration that the centre of Europe was located near the mining town of Kremnica, on a hill that forms the water division between the basins of the Baltic Sea and Black Sea, near St. John Baptist Church. The method used for calculating is unknown, but from the description given on the commemorative plaque located near the church , it seems that it has been the centre of the smallest circle circumscribed on Europe (yet the limits of Europe taken into consideration are not known). The title of the "Centre of Europe" is also claimed by the neighbouring village Krahule (ancient Blaufuß), which used to belong to the same parish, now a famous centre for winter sports, with a hotel and recreation centre called "Stred Európy" ("Centre of Europe").

Transcarpathia, today in Ukraine 

In 1887, geographers from the Austro-Hungarian Empire set up a historical marker and a large stone in what is today a part of Ukraine, believed to mark the geographic centre of Europe. The interpretation of the worn Latin inscription on the monument is debated, with some claiming that the marker is merely one of a number of fixed triangulation points for surveying purposes established around the territory of the former empire. The external borders of Europe taken into account during the calculations are not known. However, the actual location of the monument seems rather  and not the coordinates to which they relate. This is near the village of Dilove located on the Tisza river, close to the Romanian border, in the county of Rakhiv in the Transcarpathian region.

Soviet measurements 
Measurements done after World War II by Soviet scientists reconfirmed the Austria-Hungarian claim that Rakhiv and Dilove to be the geographical centre of Europe. The old marker in the small town was renewed, and a major campaign to convince everyone of its validity was undertaken.

Tillenberg/Dyleň, today in the Czech Republic/Bavaria 

Austrian geographers also marked the 939-metre-high Tillenberg (Dyleň) near the Bohemian city of Eger/Cheb with a copper plate as the centre of Europe. As the border to Germany/Bavaria runs 100 m west of the mountaintop, the German village of Bad Neualbenreuth uses this for promotional purposes. Bayerischer Rundfunk journalists asked the Institut für Geographie of the University of Munich to verify the claims. The institute concluded that the centre lies further to the south, in Hildweinsreuth near Flossenbürg.

Sweden 
In 1988 using Spherical trigonometry with the three corners of Europe as Cabo de São Vincente in the west, Spitsbergen in the north and Astrakan in the east, Arne Wennberg calculated Landskrona as the midpoint of Europe. A monument is built on the town square in the form of a pen stuck in stone.

Lithuania 

The method used for calculating this point was that of the centre of gravity of the geometrical figure of Europe.
This point is located in Lithuania, near the village of Girija. A monument, composed by the sculptor Gediminas Jokūbonis and consisting of a column of white granite surmounted by a crown of stars, was erected at the location in 2004. An area of woods and fields surrounding the geographic centre point and including Lake Girija, Bernotai Hill, and an old burial ground, was set aside as a reserve in 1992. The State Tourism Department at the Ministry of Economy of Lithuania has classified the Geographic Centre monument and its reserve as a tourist attraction. 17 km away lies Europos Parkas, Open Air Museum of the Centre of Europe, a sculpture park containing the world's largest sculpture made of TV sets.

It is the only Geographical Centre of Europe with recognition in the Guinness Book of World Records.

Hungary 

It is claimed that a 1992 survey found that the geometric centre of Europe is in the village of Tállya, Hungary . In 2000, a sculpture was erected in the village, with a table on it declaring the place the "Geometric Centre of Europe".

Belarus 

In 2000 Belarusian scientists Alexey Solomonov and Valery Anoshko published a report that stated the geographic centre of Europe was located near Lake Sho in Vitsebsk Voblast.

The scientists used a special computer program that takes Europe in a single entity – the White Sea and the Baltic Sea, Britain and Ireland were included in the program as continental zone objects. It is assumed that in the calculations to determine the center of Europe, one must take into account the inland waters of Europe and the Ural Mountains, the eastern border of Europe.

Scientists from the Russian Central Research Institute of Geodesy, Aerial Survey and Cartography confirmed the calculations of Belarusian geodesists that the geographical centre of Europe is located in Polotsk . A small monument to the Geographical Centre of Europe was set up in Polotsk on 31 May 2008.

Estonia 

Again, no author and no method of calculation have been disclosed. The local Kärla Parish is seeking to verify the location and to turn it into a tourist location.

Geographic centre of the European Union 
The French Institut Géographique National (IGN) has been calculating the changing location of what it estimates to be the geographical centre of the European Union (EU) since at least 1987. Its calculations exclude such extra-European territories of the EU as French Polynesia. As the European Union (or formerly – European Community) has grown in the last 50 years, the geographical centre has shifted with each expansion.

1987–1990 

12 members: In 1987 the centre of the European Community of the 12 members was declared to be in the middle of France, in the village of Saint-André-le-Coq, département of Puy-de-Dôme, région of Auvergne.

1990–1995 

12 members after the reunification of Germany. In 1990, the centre shifted some 25 km north-eastward, to the place called Noireterre in the village of Saint-Clément, département of Allier, the same région of Auvergne. A small monument commemorating the latter discovery still exists in Saint Clément.

1995–2004 

15 members: Using the same techniques, the IGN has identified the geographic centre of the 15-member Union (1995–2004) to be in Viroinval, Belgium, at coordinates , and a monument there records that finding.

2004–2007 

2007–2013 

2013–2020 

It is 40 km east of Frankfurt, Germany, which is headquarters to the European Central Bank.

2020–present 

Other calculations 

The geographical midpoint of the European Union is not free from disputes either. If some different extreme points of the European Union, like some Atlantic Ocean islands, are taken into consideration this point is calculated in different locations.

Eurozone 
The original centre of the Eurozone is located in France. This location has changed with the accession of new countries into the Eurozone (e.g. Slovakia 2009).

See also 
Central Europe
Centroid
Intermediate Region
Geography of Europe
Extreme points of the European Union
Geographical centre of Earth

References

Further reading 
  Useful short English language article that considers the claims of various localities to be the geographical centre of Europe.

A film about the "Center of Europe" 
A 2004 Polish-German documentary, Środek Europy (Die Mitte, "The Center"), written and directed by Stanisław Mucha, shows over a dozen different locations.

Europe
Centre
Geography of Vilnius